Drunken Song or variants may refer to:

"The Drunken Song", second last chapter of poem Zarathustra's roundelay by Friedrich Nietzsche
Drunken Songs (Ebbri canti), poem by Umberto Saba
Drunken Songs (album), album by Julian Cope 2017
Suika  (酔歌, Drunken Song), 1990 single by Ikuzo Yoshi
Das trunkene Lied ("The Drunken Song") for chorus and orchestra, first public success of Oskar Fried
Yopparatta Song (Drunken Song) by Appa (band)